Soo, also spelled Su, is a rare Korean family name, a single-syllable Korean given name, and an element in many two-syllable Korean given names. Of Sino-Korean origin, its meaning differs based on the hanja used to write it.

Family name
As a family name, Soo may be written with two different hanja, each indicating different lineages. The 2000 South Korean Census found a total of 199 people and 54 households with these family names.

The more common name means 'water'. The surviving bon-gwan (origin of a clan lineage, not necessarily the actual residence of the clan members) as of 2000 included Gangneung, Gangwon Province (46 people and 12 households); Gangnam, Seoul (41 people and 9 households); Gimhae, South Gyeongsang Province (17 people and four households); Gosan (today Wanju County), North Jeolla Province (11 people and three households); and nine people with other or unknown bon-gwan. According to the Joseon Ssijok Tongbo (조선씨족통보; 朝鮮氏族統譜), the name originated in Wuxing (today Wuxing District, Huzhou), Zhejiang, China.

The less common name means 'shore' or 'bank'. For the 75 people with this family name, the surviving bon-gwan as of 2000 included Dalseong County, Daegu (46 people and 15 households);  Miryang, South Gyeongsang Province (24 people and eight households); and five people with other or unknown bon-gwan.

Given name
There are 67 hanja with the reading "soo", and variant forms of seven of those, on the South Korean government's official list of hanja which may be registered for use in given names; they are listed in the table at right.

People with the given name Soo include:
Go Soo (born 1978), South Korean actor

Korean names which begin with this element include:

Soo-kyung
Soo-geun
Su-mi
Soo-min
Su-bin
Soo-ah
Soo-yeon
Soo-young
Soo-jung
Su-ji
Soo-jin
Soo-hyun
Soo-hee

Korean names which end with this element include:

Deok-su
Dong-soo
Sung-soo
Young-soo
Yi-soo
In-soo
Eun-soo
Jung-soo
Jong-soo
Ji-su
Jin-soo
Kwang-su
Man-soo
Myung-soo
Min-soo
Moon-soo
Beom-soo
Chul-soo
Tae-soo
Hye-su
Hyun-soo
Kyung-soo

See also
List of Korean family names
List of Korean given names

References

Korean-language surnames
Korean given names
Chinese given names